Akpanoluo Ikpong Ikpong Ette NNOM (23 September 1929 - 17 September 2018) was a Nigerian Professor of Physics and former secretary and vice-president of the Nigerian Academy of Science.

In 1991, he was elected President of the Nigerian Academy of Science to succeed Professor Caleb Olaniyan.
In 2003, he received the highest academic award in Nigeria, the Nigerian National Order of Merit Award.

Life and career
Ette was born in Upenekang, and from 1944 to 1948 attended Hope Waddell Training Institution, before studying physics at University College, Ibadan from 1949, graduating with a BSc in 1954. After teaching at Hope Waddell Training Institution from 1954 to 1959, he completed his PhD at the University of Ibadan from 1959 to 1966 while lecturing at the same institution. He was appointed a professor in 1972.

Ette died in 2018.

References

Nigerian physicists
Fellows of the Nigerian Academy of Science
Recipients of the Nigerian National Order of Merit Award
University of Ibadan alumni
Academic staff of the University of Ibadan
1929 births
2018 deaths